is a Japanese footballer currently playing as a forward for Ventforet Kofu.

Career statistics

Club
.

Notes

References

1999 births
Living people
Association football people from Saitama Prefecture
Hosei University alumni
Japanese footballers
Japan youth international footballers
Association football forwards
J2 League players
Ventforet Kofu players